Conus genuanus, common name the garter cone, is a species of sea snail, a marine gastropod mollusk in the family Conidae, the cone snails and their allies.

Like all species within the genus Conus, these snails are predatory and venomous. They are capable of "stinging" humans, therefore live ones should be handled carefully or not at all.

Description
The size of an adult shell varies between 33 mm and 75 mm. The ground color of the shell is pink-brown or violaceous brown, with revolving narrow lines of alternate white and chocolate quadrangular spots and dashes. These lines are usually alternately larger and smaller. The surface of the shell is usually smooth, but sometimes the lines are slightly elevated. The spire is smooth.

Distribution and habitat
C. genuanus occurs in the Atlantic Ocean from the Canary Islands and Cape Verde to Angola. The species prefers mud and sand at depths of 1–20 m.

References

Further reading

External links
 The Conus Biodiversity website
 
 Cone Shells – Knights of the Sea

Gallery

genuanus
Gastropods described in 1758
Taxa named by Carl Linnaeus
Molluscs of the Atlantic Ocean
Molluscs of the Canary Islands
Molluscs of Angola
Gastropods of Cape Verde
Invertebrates of Gabon
Invertebrates of West Africa